A Wildland fire module (WFM), formerly fire use module (FUM), is a 7–10 person team of firefighting personnel dedicated to planning, monitoring and starting fires. They may be deployed anywhere in the United States for resource benefits (fire use), prescribed fire and hazard fuel reduction projects.

As inter-agency national resource personnel, fire use modules have expertise in the areas of fire monitoring, ignition, holding and suppression, prescribed fire preparation and implementation support, hazard fuels reduction, and fire effects monitoring.

Fire use modules are funded by different US government agencies including the National Park Service, USDA Forest Service, and the Bureau of Land Management. The Nature Conservancy is the sole non-government entity to sponsor and support a Fire Use Module.

History 
In 1995, the US National Park Service (USNPS) founded fire use modules and hosted them in five different park units across the United States: Bandalier NM, Saguaro NP, Whisky town NRA, Zion NP, and Yellowstone NP. In 1999 the NPS created four more modules; Black Hills FUM, Cumberland Gap FUM, Great Smokes FUM, and Buffalo River FUM.

The modules were developed with the primary purpose of assisting the National Park units with fire use (wildland fire use and prescribed fire), meeting the objectives of the agency in the areas of project preparation and execution with narrow burn prescription windows. Secondarily the modules were intended to be used in monitoring fire effects, and manually reducing hazard fuels on various park units. Modules were also anticipated to be used to assist other agencies in fire use and fuels treatment projects when all the park unit objectives were met.

Other modules came into existence as the use and flexibility of fire use modules became more apparent. Most notable of these fire use modules includes those on the Stanislaus National Forest (Calvarase FUM, Summit FUM, etc.), The Ashley National Forest (Flaming Gorge WFM, Kings Peak WFM), The Bureau of Land Managements Unaweep WFM and The Nature Conservancy's Southern Rockies.

Since 2005, The U.S. Department of Agriculture (Forest Service) has also implemented the use of fire use modules (known as wildland fire modules) as well throughout the country. As of 2010 there were 17 wildland fire modules in the United States. These modules are highly qualified and extremely effective in a variety of fire ground operations ranging from basic suppression to extremely accurate fire behavior analysis and other tactical predictive services.

Configurations 
A typical module consists of the following positions:

(1) Module leader – GS-7/8/9 permanent full-time
(1) Assistant module leader – GS-6/7 permanent full-time
(2) Lead crewmember (squad leader) – GS-5/6 subject-to-furlough and permanent full-time
(3–6) Crewmembers – GS 3/4/5 temporary, subject-to-furlough, and permanent full-time.

Minimum qualifications
(1) CRWB or ENGB – Single Resource Boss
(1) FIRB – Firing boss (separate from CRWB/ENGB)
(1) ICT4 – Incident commander Type 4
(1) ICT5 – Incident commander Type 5 (separate from single resource positions)
(2) FEMO – Fire effects monitor
(2) FFT1 – Advanced firefighter (separate from single resource positions)
(2) FALB – Faller Class 2
(1) HECM – Helicopter crewmember
(2) Medical First Responder (or higher qualification)

Target qualifications
Target qualifications for WFM are listed below (qualifications are not tied to a particular position within the WFM)
 Incident Commander Type 3 (ICT3)
 Prescribed Fire Burn Boss II (RXB2)
 Prescribed Fire Burn Boss III (RXB3)
 Fire Use Manager 2 (FUM2)
 Division Supervisor (DIVS)
 Task Force Leader (TFLD)
 Strike Team Leader (STCR)
 Helicopter Manager (HELM)
 Faller B/C with crosscut certification.
 GIS Specialist (GISS)
 Field Observer (FOBS)
 Resource Advisor (READ)

Fitness goals 
As a part of fire line performance required of WFMs, the physical ability to perform arduous labor is critical to module morale, personal health and safety standards. All WFM personnel strive to meet the following goals:
1.5-mile run in a time of 11:00 or less
45 sit-ups in 60 seconds
25 pushups in 60 seconds
7 pull-ups

See also 
 Controlled burn
 Hotshot Crew
 Smokejumper
 Helitack
 Wildland fire engine
 Wildland fire tender
 Glossary of wildland fire terms
 Wildland fire suppression

References

External links
 Index of Fire Use Modules
 NWCG Standards for Wildland Fire Module Operations PMS 430, March 2019
 Wildland Fire Modules
 USFS – Wildland Fire Use
  Unaweep Fire Use Module

Wildfires
National Park Service